Samnaun is a high Alpine village and a valley at the eastern end of Switzerland and a municipality in the Engiadina Bassa/Val Müstair Region in the Swiss canton of Graubünden.

History
The valley was first used as a seasonal mountain pasture for the villages of Tschlin and Ramosch.  By 1220 the first permanent farm houses are mentioned.  These farm houses and fields were given as a gift to the Marienberg Abbey by the counts of Tarasp in the 12th century.

Geography

Of this area, 46.1% is used for agricultural purposes, while 11.7% is forested. Of the rest of the land, 0.9% is settled (buildings or roads) and the remainder (41.2%) is non-productive (rivers, glaciers or mountains).

Until 2017 it was part of the Ramosch sub-district, of the Inn district, after 2017 it was part of the Engiadina Bassa/Val Müstair Region. It consists of five village sections; Compatsch, Laret, Plan (Plaun), Ravaisch and Samnaun.

In the 19th century, Samnaun could only be reached by road from Spiss in Austria. Thus Samnaun was excluded from the Swiss Customs Area. It retains a privileged 'duty-free' status, albeit not without controversy, in the twenty-first century. The exception was maintained even after a road was built in 1905 linking Samnaun to Martina, at the most eastern point of the Lower Engadine. In winters with exceptionally heavy snowfall that blocks the road, Samnaun at times can only be reached via Austria.

Tourism
Samnaun shares a ski resort with the municipality of Ischgl in Tyrol, Austria.

The ski resort has 44 ski lifts and cable cars as well as the world's first double-decker cable car with a capacity of 180 people.

Demographics
, 19.2% of the population was made up of foreign nationals. Over the last 10 years the population has grown at a rate of 1%.

, the gender distribution of the population was 49.1% male and 50.9% female.  The age distribution, in Samnaun is; 267 children or 8.7% of the population are between 0 and 9 years old.  155 teenagers or 5.1% are 10 to 14, and 281 teenagers or 9.2% are 15 to 19.  Of the adult population, 460 people or 15.0% of the population are between 20 and 29 years old.  541 people or 17.6% are 30 to 39, 462 people or 15.1% are 40 to 49, and 385 people or 12.5% are 50 to 59.  The senior population distribution is 209 people or 6.8% of the population are between 60 and 69 years old, 189 people or 6.2% are 70 to 79, there are 103 people or 3.4% who are 80 to 89, and there are 17 people or 0.6% who are 90 to 99.

In the 2007 federal election the most popular party was the CVP which received 45.7% of the vote.  The next three most popular parties were the SVP (29.2%), the FDP (15.5%) and the SPS (7.2%).

In Samnaun about 53.6% of the population (between age 25-64) have completed either non-mandatory upper secondary education or additional higher education (either university or a Fachhochschule).

Samnaun has an unemployment rate of 1.01%.  , there were 46 people employed in the primary economic sector and about 26 businesses involved in this sector.  52 people are employed in the secondary sector and there are 10 businesses in this sector.  743 people are employed in the tertiary sector, with 105 businesses in this sector.

The historical population is given in the following table:

Languages
Most of the population speaks German (93.5%), with Portuguese being second most common (1.7%) and Serbo-Croatian being third (1.6%).  Uniquely within Switzerland, the form of German spoken by the residents of Samnaun is a variant of the Bavarian language. Until the second half of the nineteenth century the population spoke a dialect of Romansh close to Vallader.

See also
Campione d'Italia, an Italian enclave surrounded by Switzerland.
Livigno in Italy, a duty-free area in Italy.

References

External links
Samnaun Tourism
Samnaun Engadin
History of Samnaun

 
Ski areas and resorts in Switzerland
Municipalities of Graubünden
Duty-free zones of Europe
Special economic zones
Tax avoidance